Gregorio Gios (born 29 June 1999) is an Italian ice hockey player for HC Fassa and the Italian national team.

He represented Italy at the 2021 IIHF World Championship.

References

External links

1999 births
Living people
Bolzano HC players
Expatriate ice hockey players in Finland
Expatriate ice hockey players in the United States
SHC Fassa players
Italian expatriate ice hockey people
Italian expatriate sportspeople in Finland
Italian expatriate sportspeople in the United States
Italian ice hockey defencemen
People from Asiago
Sportspeople from the Province of Vicenza